R. N. Jayagopal (1935 – 19 May 2008) was an Indian film director and lyricist in Kannada cinema. He had written over 12,000 film songs.

Early life and education
R. N. Jayagopal, known to friends and fans as RNJ, was born in 1935 to R. Nagendra Rao, another great of Kannada cinema. He did his primary and college education in Bangalore. He learnt Carnatic music from B. S. Raj Iyengar and was good at playing the violin.
Jayagopal was one of four sons of his parents. His other famous siblings were older brother R. N. K. Prasad, who was a cinematographer, and younger brother R. N. Sudarshan, a veteran film actor and producer.

Career
Jayagopal entered the film industry by writing the lyrics of "Tribhuvana Janani Jaganmohini" for the 1957 film Premada Putri produced by his father. From then on, he wrote script, dialogue and lyrics for hundreds of films. He had directed eight films, including Dhumaketu, Kesarina Kamala and Avala Antaranga. He won the State award as best dialogue writer for Namma Makkalu and Pallavi Anu Pallavi, which was Mani Ratnam's first film.

He did direct many serials as well, but he remained preoccupied by writing lyrics for Kannada films. His lyrics were meaningful and had a high degree of lyrical value. Many of his songs have been hugely successful not only for the tune composition, but as well for the quality of the songs.

Jayagopal worked in the company of other great writers like Chi. Udaya Shankar, Vijaya Narasimha, Sarot Aswath, Hunsur Krishnamurthy and others.

Jayagopal started the first school in Chennai to offer Kannada as a second language - Vidya Vinaya Vinoda Mat. Hr. Sec. School. He also made his mark in the Tamil film industry with his well acclaimed roles in movies like Nayakan and Michael Madana Kama Rajan.

Notable lyrics
 "Haadonda Haaduve Nee Kelu Maguve"
 "Neerinalli Aleya Ungura"
 "Sanyaasi Sanyaasi Arjuna Sanyaasi"
 "Bellimodadha Anchinindha"
 "Gaganavu Ello Bhoomiyu Ello"
 "Nee Bandu Nintaga Nintu Neenu Nakkaga"
 "Nagu Endhidhe Manjina Bindu"
 "Naguva Nayana Madhura Mouna"
 "Raagake Swaravagi, Swarake Padavaagi"
 "Noorondu Nenapu Yedeyaaladinda"
 "Premada Kaadambari Baredanu Kanneerali"

Filmography

As lyricist

As director

Awards
Karnataka State Film Awards
 1968-69 : Best Dialogue – Namma Makkalu (1969)
 1982-83 : Best Dialogue – Pallavi Anu Pallavi (1983)
 1985-86: Special Award (Lyrics) – Swabhimana (1985)

Death
He died on 19 May 2008 at the age of 72 following a cardiac arrest. His wife Lalita Jayagopal died two years later, on 13 June 2010.

References

External links
 
 RNJayagopal.com

Indian male songwriters
2008 deaths
1935 births
Kannada-language lyricists
Kannada film directors
Musicians from Mysore
Film musicians from Karnataka
20th-century Indian composers
21st-century Indian composers
20th-century male musicians
21st-century male musicians